Stefan Emanuel "Steve" Warschawski (April 18, 1904 – May 5, 1989) was a mathematician, a professor and department chair at the University of Minnesota and the founder of the mathematics department at the University of California, San Diego.

Early life and education
Warschawski was born in Lida, now in Belarus; at the time of his birth Lida was part of the Russian Empire. His father was a Russian medical doctor, and his mother was ethnically German; the family spoke German at home. In 1915, his family moved to Königsberg, in Prussia (now Kaliningrad, Russia), the home of his mother's family.

Warschawski studied at the University of Königsberg until 1926 and then moved to the University of Göttingen for his doctoral studies under the supervision of Alexander Ostrowski. Ostrowski moved to the University of Basel and Warschawski followed him there to complete his studies.

Career
After receiving his Ph.D., Warschawski took a position at Göttingen in 1930 but, due to the rise of Hitler and his own Jewish ancestry, he soon moved to Utrecht University in Utrecht, Netherlands and then Columbia University in New York City.

After a sequence of temporary positions, he found a permanent faculty position at Washington University in St. Louis in 1939. During World War II he moved to Brown University and then the University of Minnesota, where he remained until his 1963 move to San Diego, where he was the founding chair of the mathematics department. Warschawski stepped down as chair in 1967, and retired in 1971, but remained active in research: approximately one third of his research publications were written after his retirement. Over the course of his career, he advised 19 Ph.D. students, all but one at either Minnesota or San Diego. Vernor Vinge is among Warschawski's doctoral students.

Research
Warschawski was known for his research on complex analysis and in particular on conformal maps. He also made contributions to the theory of minimal surfaces and harmonic functions.

The Noshiro–Warschawski theorem is named after Warschawski and Noshiro, who discovered it independently; it states that, if f is an analytic function on the open unit disk such that the real part of its first derivative is positive, then f is one-to-one. 

In 1980, he solved the Visser–Ostrowski problem for derivatives of conformal mappings at the boundary.

Legacy
Warschawski was honored in 1978 by the creation of the Stefan E. Warschawski Assistant Professorship at San Diego. The Stephen E. Warschawski Memorial Scholarship was also given in his name in 1999–2000 to four UCSD undergraduates as a one-time award. His wife, Ilse, died in 2009 and left a US$1 million bequest to UCSD, part of which went towards endowing a professorship in the mathematics department.

References

1904 births
1989 deaths
People from Lida
People from Lidsky Uyezd
Mathematical analysts
20th-century American mathematicians
University of Königsberg alumni
University of Göttingen alumni
University of Basel alumni
Academic staff of the University of Göttingen
Academic staff of Utrecht University
Columbia University faculty
Washington University in St. Louis faculty
Washington University in St. Louis mathematicians
Brown University faculty
University of Minnesota faculty
University of California, San Diego faculty
Emigrants from the Russian Empire to Germany
German emigrants to the United States